Skikda (formerly Philippeville from 1838 to 1962 and Rusicade in ancient times) is a city in northeastern Algeria and a port on the Mediterranean. It is the capital of Skikda Province and Skikda District.

History

The Phoenicians and Carthaginians established a trading post and fort named  ("Jug Cape") after Skikda's nearby cape. Falling under Roman hegemony after the Punic Wars, the name was Latinized as Rusicade or Rusiccade. Rusicade contained the largest Roman theatre in Algeria, dating to the reign of Hadrian.

In late antiquity, the port was destroyed during the Vandals' invasion of 530. The Byzantines reconquered the region in 533 and 534, but left large areas under Berber control. The town was overrun by the Umayyad Caliphate at the end of the 7th century.

Present-day Skikda was founded by Sylvain Charles Valée in 1838 under the name Philippeville, honoring the French king at the time. The French were in the process of annexing Algeria and developed Philippeville as a port for Constantine, Algeria's third-largest city. The two cities were connected by rail. The harbour works, with every vessel in port, was destroyed by a storm in 1878; a larger harbour was then built. On 10 October 1883, there was an earthquake in Philippeville.

Towards the end of World War II, a UNRRA refugee camp name  was established near the city. On 25 January 1945, 200 Jews holding citizenship from countries in North and South America were sent from the Bergen-Belsen concentration camp to Switzerland as part of a prisoner exchange group. They were later sent to the UNRRA camp in Skikda.

Battle of Philippeville

An attack by the FLN in 1955 during the war of Independence left around 123 civilians dead, mainly French and those suspected of collaboration. Angered over the massacre of civilians, including women, seniors, and babies, the French escalated their offensive against the FLN. Reprisals by French forces may have killed between 1,200 (according to French sources,) and 12,000 civilians (according to the FLN.)

1989 shipping disaster
The city has a commercial harbour with a gas and oil terminal. On 15 February 1989 the Dutch tanker the MV Maassluis was anchored just outside the port, waiting to dock the next day at the terminal, when extreme weather broke out. The ship's anchors did not hold and the ship smashed on the pier-head of the port. The disaster killed 27 of the 29 people on board.

Modern Skikda
The city has a population of 250,000. Natural gas, oil refining, and petrochemical industries were developed in the 1970s and pipelines have been built for their transportation. The city hall (a neo-moorish style palace) and the railroad station were designed by Le Corbusier.

The official city flag colours are blue and white, the colours of the Mediterranean. The current postal code is 21000. Skikda has the third largest commercial port in Algeria after Algiers and Oran. It has also a petrochemical terminal port and a smaller fishing port in Stora, and there are many beaches along the natural Mediterranean coastline. There is also a closed airport near the petrochemical complex.

Geography

Skikda lies on the coast of the Gulf of Stora, part of the Mediterranean Sea. The landscape is hilly and forested, with high ridges on both the western and eastern sides of the city.

Climate
Skikda has a Mediterranean climate (Köppen climate classification Csa), with cool, wet winters and very warm, dry summers.

Economy

Historically, Skikda is known for its seaport. It was described, in 1911, by Baedeker as having "the youngest Algerian seaport."
On 19 January 2004, a fire and explosion at the Skikda LNG facility killed 29 people and caused $940,000,000 worth of damage.  The accident incapacitated three LNG trains and impacted approximately 2% of the world's liquefaction capacity. The explosion was preceded by the ingestion of a sizable leak of cold hydrocarbon into the boiler of the westernmost LNG line. This caused the boiler to explode. According to the 2014 Marsh report into the world's largest industrial disaster, the Skikda explosion is ranked No. 3 in the hydrocarbon industry.

Transportation

The main road from Skikda is the N3 to El Arrouch, Constantine, Batna, Biskra and Touggourt. Smaller local roads lead to the towns of Stora (to the northwest along the coast), Beni Bechir (to the south), Bissy and Azzaba (to the southeast), and El Mersa and Chetaibi (to the east).

Skikda is the terminus of the Algiers-Skikda line – one of the SNTF mainline railroads, although most passenger and cargo services branch off in nearby Ramdane Djamel (towards the Ramdane Djamel-Annaba or Ramdane Djamel-Jijel lines before reaching Skikda). The city is served by  Skikda Airport, although this airport is currently unused.

Notable people
 Fadéla M'rabet, writer and feminist

References

Citations

Bibliography
 .

External links

 Skikda District's Official Website

Communes of Skikda Province
Coastal cities in Algeria
Cities in Algeria
Province seats of Algeria
Phoenician colonies in Algeria
Algeria